Ramón García Hirales (born 10 September 1982) is a Mexican professional boxer who held the WBO light flyweight title in 2011. He is the twin brother of ex-WBO and IBF minimumweight world champion Raúl García.

Professional career

Interim WBO Light Flyweight title
On July 24, 2010 Hirales won the interim WBO Light Flyweight title by beating titleholder Johnriel Casimero from the Philippines in a twelve rounds decision.

He defended his title against Manuel Vargas by majority decision. He lost the interim title to Jesús Géles by split decision.

WBO Light Flyweight title
On April 30, 2011, he faced Géles in a rematch for the full WBO light flyweight title. Garcia-Hirales won the bout by fourth round knock out to become the world champion. Garcia-Hirales and his brother Raul made history on this night when they became the first set of twin brothers to win world titles on the same card.

Professional boxing record

See also
List of light flyweight boxing champions
List of WBO world champions
List of Mexican boxing world champions

References

External links

Boxers from Baja California Sur
People from La Paz, Baja California Sur
Light-flyweight boxers
World boxing champions
World light-flyweight boxing champions
World Boxing Organization champions
1982 births
Living people
Twin sportspeople
Mexican twins
Mexican male boxers